Pind Ranjha is a small village located in Sargodha District, located 30 kilometers from Kot Momin M2 motorway interchange.

References

Populated places in Sargodha District